The Carina Dwarf Spheroidal Galaxy is a dwarf galaxy in the Carina constellation.  It was discovered in 1977 with the UK Schmidt Telescope by Cannon et al. The Carina Dwarf Spheroidal galaxy is a satellite galaxy of the Milky Way and is receding from it at 230 km/s. The diameter of the galaxy is about 1600 light-years, which is 75 times smaller than the Milky Way. Most of the stars in the galaxy formed 7 billion years ago, although it also experienced bursts of star formation about 13 and 3 billion years ago. It is also being tidally disrupted by the Milky Way galaxy.

References

External links

Carina Dwarf at SEDS
Observations of Tidal Disruption of the Carina Dwarf Spheroidal Galaxy

Dwarf spheroidal galaxies
Local Group
Milky Way Subgroup
Carina (constellation)
19441
?